The Golden Grove Football Club, more commonly known as the Kookaburras, is an Australian Rules Football Club based in the north-eastern suburbs of Adelaide that was formed in 1995. The club is based at Harper's Field, located on One Tree Hill Road in the northern suburbs of Adelaide. Golden Grove's senior teams compete in the Adelaide Footy League Division 2, Division 2 Reserves, Division C2, & C8 competitions. Its women's teams compete in the SAWFL Division 2, & Division 6 Reserves competitions, whilst its junior teams compete in the SANFL Juniors competition.

History 
The football club lobbied for a long time to find a permanent home, with the club outgrowing its temporary home at the Greenwith Oval & Greenwith Community Centre within the first two years, after rapidly growing junior numbers. Despite this, the council, unfortunately, had nowhere else for the club to move to, and the club had to wait until 2001 before a decision to move from its temporary clubrooms could be made. Talks were held in the 2002 pre-season for the club to move its base to Golden Grove High School. However, negotiations with the school were stopped as neither party could agree on the building of a licensed clubhouse. Club officials were "disgraced" when offered a stop-gap solution by the council at the end of the 2002 season, offering to build new toilets and changerooms, but no clubrooms.

A breakthrough for a permanent home occurred in 2004 when the club was given the green light for a future permanent home at Harpers Field. However, there was still the major hurdle of funding for clubrooms. Originally approved for a $2.1m council grant to build clubrooms, this was later declined due to a change in federal government and the council not willing to pick up the extra 50% funding.  A match in 2004 was one for the history books, when the Golden Grove A Grade defeated Greenacres by an enormous 297 points. This still remains the club's biggest win, highest score and the Adelaide Footy League's 27th highest ever score in a single match - 51.21 (327) d. 5.3 (33).

Late 2008 saw the final documents signed to secure a clubhouse and by the start of the 2010 season, the club was ready to operate from its new home. The club made agreements with Tea Tree Gully Council to assist with the development of the Harpers Field site and this led to the work starting on the second oval. The oval was finished and ready to use at the start of the 2013 season. This gave the club two ovals and marked the end of the use of Greenwith Oval. Since 2013, the club has developed the site to include goal netting, an electronic scoreboard, a canteen/kitchen extension and new lighting. The new floodlights were officially switched on at the trial game against Modbury on Saturday 21 March 2015. Early in 2015 the committee signed a ten-year lease of the Harpers Field site with Tea Tree Gully which gives the club primary use of all the facilities.

More recently the club was awarded a share of a national grant to upgrade women's change rooms at sporting venues around Australia. The upgraded changerooms were completed for the beginning of the 2017 season.

During the 2017 season, the 'Kookaburras' made their way through to the Division 3 Grand Final facing the Brighton Bombers who were competing in their first Adelaide Footy League season since moving from the Southern Football League, returning to the league they left 20 years ago. They were comfortably beaten by 49 points, however ensured their promotion into Division 2 for the 2018 season, being the highest division the club had ever competed in since its inception.

At an October 2019 Tea Tree Gully Council meeting, the Golden Grove Football Club had the motion passed for a feasibility study regarding expansion and a new clubhouse to be undertaken at Harpers Field. Following this feasibility study, a grant of $12 million dollars was approved in April 2021 for a significant upgrade to the Harpers Field clubrooms and facilities. Early on-site works began in late 2022, with main building works expected to commence from February 2023 and the project to be now to be completed in 2024. Plans include four inclusive changerooms, bar, function area and viewing platform.

Senior Performance 

*2020 Season was half the length, cut short due to COVID-19. The Adelaide Footy League informed all clubs that there would also be no promotion or relegation for the 2020 season.

Club Honours 
Total premierships: 37 (16 senior / 22 junior)

* Denotes undefeated premiership
Senior
A Grade: 2003, 2008, 2014, 2020, 2022
 B Grade: 2002, 2007, 2014, 2020, 2021, 2022
 C Grade: 2008, 2010, 2021
Under 18: 2019 (Div 1)
 Under 17: 2006
Junior Boys
Under 16: 2005, 2006, 2007
 Under 15: 2009, 2021 (Div 4)
 Under 14: 2017
 Under 13: 2005, 2018, 2019 (Div 1), 2019 (Div 3)
 Under 12: 2015, 2017, 2022 (Div 1)
 Under 11: 2009, 2011, 2016
 Junior Girls
 Under 15: 2021
Under 13: 2010
 Under 12: 2018, 2019

Golden Grove Juniors in the AFL

Golden Grove Juniors in the AFLW

Guernseys

Senior home guernseys 

 1997–1999: green, gold and blue tri-panel (seniors only)
 2000–2016: stylised gold kookaburra on a green/blue base, blue collar and cuffs, gold numbers
 2017-current: green base, gold chevron with blue upper, blue cuffs and collar, gold numbers

Senior clash guernseys 

 2004–2020: stylised blue kookaburra on a gold base
 2021-current: gold base, blue and green chevrons, blue cuffs and collar, blue numbers

Junior guernseys 

 1996–2000: bottle green base, yellow and blue 'V's, blue cuffs and collar, gold numbers (juniors only)
 2000-current: stylised gold kookaburra on a green/blue base, blue collar and cuffs, gold numbers

One-off guernseys 

 2011: Breast Cancer Awareness Guernsey – pink base and pink numbers
 2015: 20th Anniversary Guernsey – throwback guernsey based on 1996 junior guernsey
 2016: ANZAC Day Guernsey – camouflage guernsey based on a modern take on the 1996 junior guernsey
 2021: 1997 Inaugural Guernsey Replica - green, gold and blue tri panel

Grounds 
 1996–2015: Greenwith Oval, The Golden Way, Greenwith (used as an overflow oval for junior games from 2005-2015)
 2001–2003: Hargreaves Reserve (used as an overflow oval for junior games)
 2005–current: Harpers Field, One Tree Hill Road, Golden Grove

References

External links 
 

Australian rules football clubs in South Australia
1995 establishments in Australia
Sporting clubs in Adelaide
Australian rules football clubs established in 1995